The Tokelau Table Tennis Association was formed on the islands of Tokelau in October 2010. It was the first sport in Tokelau to be granted membership at a Continental or World level. They became the 23rd member of the Oceania Table Tennis Federation.

References

External links
 

Tokelau
Organisations based in Tokelau